The Tartu TV Mast is a truss tower located in Tammelinn, Tartu, Estonia. In 2011 the antenna was rebuilt. It is one of the tallest structures in Estonia.

References

External links
 

Buildings and structures in Tartu
Towers completed in 1957
Radio masts and towers in Europe
Communication towers in Estonia
1957 establishments in Estonia